The 2003 PSA Men's World Open Squash Championship is the men's edition of the 2003 World Open, which serves as the individual world championship for squash players. The event took place in Lahore in Pakistan from 14 December to 21 December 2003. Amr Shabana won his first World Open title, defeating Thierry Lincou in the final.

Seeds

Draw and results

Finals

Top half

Section 1

Section 2

Bottom half

Section 1

Section 2

See also
PSA World Open
2003 Women's World Open Squash Championship

References

External links
World Open 2003 Squashtalk page
PSA World Open 2003 website

World Squash Championships
M
2003 in Pakistani sport
2000s in Lahore
Sport in Lahore
Squash tournaments in Pakistan
International sports competitions hosted by Pakistan